Custer's Last Stand is a 1936 American film serial based on the historical Custer's Last Stand at the Little Bighorn River. It was directed by Elmer Clifton, and starred Rex Lease, William Farnum and Jack Mulhall. It was produced by the Poverty Row studio Stage & Screen Productions, which went bust shortly afterwards as a victim of the Great Depression. This serial stars many famous and popular B-Western actors as well as silent serial star Helen Gibson playing Calamity Jane, Frank McGlynn Jr. as General Custer, and Allen Greer as Wild Bill Hickok.

In April of the same year, the serial was edited into an 84-minute feature film, which was released under the same name.

Plot overview
The serial follows multiple plot threads, centering on a Medicine Arrow taken in battle and a secret gold mine, in the lead up to the Battle of Little Big Horn.

Cast
Rex Lease as Kit Cardigan and his father John C. Cardigan
Lona Andre as Belle Meade
William Farnum as James Fitzpatrick
Ruth Mix as Elizabeth Custer
Jack Mulhall as Lieutenant Cook
Nancy Caswell as Barbara Trent
George Chesebro as Lieutenant Frank Roberts
Dorothy Gulliver as Red Fawn
Frank McGlynn Jr. as General George A. Custer
Helen Gibson as Calamity Jane
Josef Swickard as Major Henry Trent, MD
Chief Thundercloud as Young Wolf
Allen Greer as Wild Bill Hickok
High Eagle as Crazy Horse
Howling Wolf as Sitting Bull

Production
Commenting on the plot, Cline notes that this serial contains several historical characters in a purely fictitious setting. "The story rambled through a series of loosely connected plots and sub plots" leading to Little Big Horn.

Stunts
Yakima Canutt
Ken Cooper 
Carl Mathews
Mabel Strickland  (riding double)
Wally West

Release

Theatrical
Custer's Last Stand was well received by action fans, regardless of its historical inaccuracies.

Chapter titles
 Perils of the Plains
 Thundering Hoofs [sic]
 Fires of Vengeance
 The Ghost Dancers
 Trapped
 Human Wolves
 Demons of Disaster
 White Treachery
 Circle of Death
 Flaming Arrow
 Warpath
 Firing Squad
 Red Panthers
 Custer's Last Ride
 The Last Stand
Source:

See also
 List of film serials by year
 List of film serials by studio

References

External links

1936 films
1936 Western (genre) films
1930s independent films
American Indian Wars films
American Western (genre) films
American black-and-white films
1930s English-language films
Films directed by Elmer Clifton
Film serials
Films set in 1876
American independent films
Battle of the Little Bighorn
Cultural depictions of George Armstrong Custer
Cultural depictions of Sitting Bull
Cultural depictions of Wild Bill Hickok
Cultural depictions of Crazy Horse
Cultural depictions of Calamity Jane
Films about Native Americans
1930s American films